Emil Welz (born April 5, 1879, date of death unknown) was a German track and field athlete who competed in the 1908 Summer Olympics and in the 1912 Summer Olympics.

In 1908 he finished eleventh in the discus throw competition. He also participated in the freestyle javelin event but his result is unknown. Four years later he finished 24th in the discus throw competition.

References

External links
list of German athletes

1879 births
Year of death missing
German male javelin throwers
German male discus throwers
Olympic athletes of Germany
Athletes (track and field) at the 1908 Summer Olympics
Athletes (track and field) at the 1912 Summer Olympics